GoAccess is an open-source web analytics application for Unix-like operating systems. 

The application has both a text-based and a web application user interface. 

GoAccess can provide real-time analytics by continuously monitoring web server logs.

See also

List of web analytics software

References

External links

Web analytics
Free web analytics software